Ministerio de Defensa Nacional, meaning Ministry of National Defense in Spanish may refer to:

Ministry of National Defense (Chile)
Ministry of National Defence (Colombia)
Ministry of National Defence (Ecuador)
Ministry of National Defence (Portugal)